Midlands 4 East (North) is a level 9 English Rugby Union league and level 4 of the Midlands League, made up of teams from the northern part of the East Midlands region including clubs from Derbyshire, Lincolnshire, Nottinghamshire and the occasional team from Leicestershire, with home and away matches played throughout the season. Each year some of the clubs in this division also take part in the RFU Junior Vase - a level 9-12 national competition.

Formed for the 2006–07 season, the division was originally known as Midlands 5 East (North) but changed to its present name for the 2008–09 season due to league restructuring. Promoted teams tend to move up to Midlands 3 East (North). Up until the 2017–18 season, relegated teams dropped down to Midlands 5 East (North), but since that division has been abolished there is currently no relegation.

The division was split across two geographic areas (East & West) for the 2021–22 season as part of an RFU reorganisation of the Midlands regional league.

2021–22

Skegness, who finished 12th in 2019–20, were placed in the East division for the current season but were unable to fulfil their fixtures and subsequently withdrew from the league.

The teams competing in 2021–22 achieved their places in the league based on performances in 2019–20, the positions in brackets refer to that season not 2020–21.

Participating teams & locations

East

West

2020–21
Due to the COVID-19 pandemic, the 2020–21 season was cancelled.

2019–20

Participating teams & locations

2018–19

Participating teams & locations

2017–18

Participating teams & locations

Teams 2016–17
Amber Valley 
Boston (relegated from Midlands 3 East (North))
East Retford 
Long Eaton	
Mellish
Meden Vale (promoted from Midlands 5 East (North))
Nottingham Moderns (relegated from Midlands 3 East (North))
Ollerton (promoted from Midlands 5 East (North))
Tupton	
Worksop

Teams 2015–16
Amber Valley (relegated from Midlands 3 East (North))
Bingham	
Birstall (promoted from Midlands 5 East (North))
Buxton 
Cleethorpes	
East Retford 
Long Eaton	
Mellish (relegated from Midlands 3 East (North))
North Hykeham (promoted from Midlands 5 East (North))
Rolls-Royce 
Tupton	
Worksop

Teams 2014–15
Ashfield
Belper
Bingham	
Buxton	
Cleethorpes	
East Retford (relegated from Midlands 3 East (North))
Keyworth
Long Eaton	
Rolls-Royce (promoted from Midlands 5 East (North))
Skegness (relegated from Midlands 3 East (North))
Tupton	
Worksop

Teams 2013–14
Amber Valley (relegated from Midlands 3 East (North))
Ashfield
Belper	(relegated from Midlands 3 East (North))
Bingham (promoted from Midlands 5 East (North))
Chesterfield Panthers
Cleethorpes
Keyworth
Leesbrook (promoted from Midlands 5 East (North))
Long Eaton
Nottinghamians
Tupton	
Worksop

Teams 2012–13
Ashfield
Boston
Chesterfield Panthers
Cleethorpes
Horncastle
Keyworth
Long Eaton
Nottinghamians
Nottingham Corsairs
Skegness
Tupton	
Worksop

Teams 2009–10
Belper (promoted from Midlands 5 East (North))
Castle Donington (promoted from Midlands 5 East (North))
Chesterfield Panthers
Cleethorpes
Dronfield
East Leake
East Retford
Leesbrook 
Nottinghamians
Rolls-Royce (promoted from Midlands 5 East (North))
Skegness Panthers
Uttoxeter

Teams 2008–09
Amber Valley
Ashby
Ashfield
Barton & District (promoted from Midlands 5 East (North))
Belgrave 
Boston 
Kesteven
Market Rasen & Louth
Mellish
Nottingham Casuals (promoted from Midlands 5 East (North))
Oakham
Southwell

Original teams

When this division was introduced in 2006 as Midlands 5 East (North), it contained the following teams:

Bakewell Mannerians - promoted from Derbyshire/North Leicestershire (champions)
Boston - transferred from Notts, Lincs, Derbyshire/North Leicestershire (3rd)
Dronfield - transferred from Notts, Lincs, Derbyshire/North Leicestershire (9th)
East Leake - transferred from Notts, Lincs, Derbyshire/North Leicestershire (6th)
Keyworth - transferred from Notts, Lincs, Derbyshire/North Leicestershire (7th)
Long Eaton - transferred from Notts, Lincs, Derbyshire/North Leicestershire (8th)
Nottingham Casuals - transferred from Notts, Lincs, Derbyshire/North Leicestershire (4th)
Nottinghamians - promoted from Nottinghamshire/Lincolnshire (champions)
University of Derby - promoted from Derbyshire/North Leicestershire (runners up)
Worksop - transferred from Notts, Lincs, Derbyshire/North Leicestershire (5th)

Midlands 4 East (North) honours

Midlands 5 West (North) (2006–2009)

League restructuring ahead of the 2006–07 season saw the introduction of Midlands 5 East (North) and its counterpart Midlands 5 East (South) at tier 9 to replace the discontinued East Midlands/South Leicestershire 1 and Notts, Lincs, Derbyshire/North Leicestershire leagues. Promotion was to Midlands 4 East (North) and relegation to either Midlands 6 East (North-East) or Midlands 6 East (North-West).

Midlands 4 East (North) (2009–present)
Further league restructuring by the RFU meant that Midlands 5 East (North) and Midlands 5 East (South) were renamed as Midlands 4 East (North) and Midlands 4 East (South), with both leagues remaining at tier 9. Promotion was now to Midlands 3 East (North) (formerly Midlands 4 East (North)) and relegation to Midlands 5 East (North) (formerly Midlands 6 East (North)) until that league was discontinued at the end of the 2017–18 season.

Number of league titles

Belper (2)
Boston (2)
Ashfield (1)
Bakewell Mannerians (1)
Barton & District (1)
Buxton (1)
Chesterfield Panthers (1)
Grimsby (1)
Long Eaton (1)
Southwell (1)
Uttoxeter (1)
Worksop (1)

Notes

See also
Midlands RFU
Leicestershire RU
Notts, Lincs & Derbyshire RFU
English rugby union system
Rugby union in England

References

Rugby First: To view previous seasons in the league, search for any club within that league then click on to club details followed by fixtures and then select the appropriate season.

9
5